Lander Gabilondo Bernal (born 30 April 1987) is a Spanish professional footballer who plays mainly as a right winger.

Club career

Spain
Born in San Sebastián, Basque Country, Gabilondo finished his youth career with local Real Sociedad. After appearing in one Segunda División B game in 2005–06 with the B-side, whilst still a junior (a 1–1 home draw against Zalla UC on 26 February 2006), he went on to compete three full seasons with the reserves in that tier.

From 2009 to 2011, Gabilondo continued to play in the third level, with CA Osasuna B.

Swindon Town
Gabilondo joined English Football League Two club Swindon Town on trial in August 2011, signing a one-year contract on the 19th. He made his debut for his new team on 21 August, in a 1–2 home defeat to Oxford United.

Swindon promoted to Football League One at the end of the season, but Gabilondo appeared in less than one quarter of the league matches. He was released in May 2012.

Honours
Swindon Town
Football League Two: 2011–12

References

External links

1987 births
Living people
Spanish footballers
Footballers from San Sebastián
Association football wingers
Segunda División B players
Tercera División players
Antiguoko players
Real Sociedad B footballers
CA Osasuna B players
SD Amorebieta footballers
Real Unión footballers
SD Formentera players
SD Leioa players
English Football League players
Swindon Town F.C. players
Spanish expatriate footballers
Expatriate footballers in England
Spanish expatriate sportspeople in England